Cyrus Adams Reed (June 5, 1825 – July 11, 1910) was an adjutant general in the U.S. state of Oregon in the 1860s, and a member of the Oregon Legislative Assembly.

Reed was born June 5, 1825, in Manchester, New Hampshire. He came to Portland in 1849, and married Lucinda Coffin, daughter of General Stephen Coffin, shortly thereafter. He was the first president and custodian of the Portland Public Library Association.

He relocated to Salem, Oregon, for a time, establishing Reed's Opera House there, before returning to Portland.

References

Works authored 
 Adjutant General's Report to the Oregon Legislature, 1865–66.

1825 births
1910 deaths
Politicians from Portland, Oregon
Members of the Oregon House of Representatives